Nicanor "Nick" Baptista Reyes Sr. (Born: Nicanor Reyes Icasiano, January 2, 1894 – February 9, 1945) was a Filipino educator. He was the founder and first president of the Far Eastern University in the City of Manila, Philippines.

Biography 
Nicanor Reyes was born to Francisco Reyes and Macaria Baptista in Trozo, Manila. Dr. Reyes envisioned a school that would promote the teaching of accounting to Filipinos, a profession formerly available only to foreigners. He wanted to prove that Filipinos were capable and trustworthy in handling the hundred of enterprises that would result with the coming of the independence of the country. 

He earned an A.B. in 1915 from the University of the Philippines, a bachelor's degree in Commercial Science from New York University in 1917, and a Master of Arts degree in Business Administration from Columbia University the following year. He received his Ph.D. in Accountancy from Columbia - the first Filipino to do so, which was also the first degree of its kind to be awarded by Columbia.

Reyes was married to Amparo de Leon Mendoza and had five children

Death 
Towards the end of the Pacific War, during the Battle of Manila, the retreating Japanese forces killed Dr. Reyes and members of his family: his wife, and two youngest children on February 9, 1945 at their residence along Taft Avenue. Their remains are buried at the Manila Memorial Park.

Legacy 

 Since it was his dream to set up a medical school alongside the university, in 1970, the FEU Institute of Medicine, School of Medical Technology, and FEU Hospital were converted into a non-stock, non-profit educational foundation, the FEU - Nicanor Reyes Medical Foundation.
In 1994, in commemoration of his birth centennial, FEU Diliman was established.
 Morayta Street in Sampaloc, Manila wherein the university is situated has been renamed after him.

References

Academic staff of Far Eastern University
1894 births
1945 deaths
Columbia University alumni